Rasmussen University is a private for-profit university with multiple locations throughout the United States. It offers associate's, bachelor's, master's and doctoral degrees at 23 campuses in Minnesota, Illinois, North Dakota, Florida, Wisconsin, Kansas and offers many programs fully online. In October 2020, American Public Education, Inc began the process of acquiring Rasmussen.

Rasmussen offers on-campus and online classes leading to Bachelor of Science (BS), Associate of Applied Science (AAS), and Associate of Science (AS) degrees in career-focused areas. It also offers a variety of certificates and diplomas.

History

Walter Rasmussen founded the school in 1900 as the Rasmussen Practical School of Business, in Stillwater, Minnesota. Rasmussen believed the need for skilled professionals by the local business community was not being met. With the advent of women's suffrage in 1920 through the Nineteenth Amendment, the school’s female enrollment began to increase. In 1945 Walter Rasmussen retired and named Walter Nemitz to succeed him as director of the college. Nemitz had been with the college since 1934 and as director instituted a number of curriculum upgrades. By 1950, more than 22,400 students had graduated from the school. In 1961, Walter's sons Wilbur Nemitz and Robert Nemitz took ownership of the school. In 1974, Rasmussen College acquired the St. Cloud Business College, and in 1979 acquired the Northern Technical School of Business. In 1983, the school opened a campus in Mankato, Minnesota. More campuses were opened in Eagan, Minnesota (1989), St. Cloud, Minnesota (1997), Rockford, Illinois (2006), Lake Elmo, Minnesota; Eden Prairie, Minnesota; Blaine, Minnesota (2010),  Topeka, Kansas (2013), Overland Park, Kansas (2013) and Green Bay, Wisconsin (2007), Mokena-Tinley Park, Illinois (2010) and Wausau, Wisconsin (2010).

In 2001, Rasmussen College was accredited by the Higher Learning Commission.

Rasmussen opened an online campus in 2002. The school acquired Aakers College in North Dakota and Webster College in Florida and merged the schools into Rasmussen's operations. Presently, the school has more than 100,000 graduates.

In 2010, Rasmussen College announced a partnership with Market Motive Inc and announced programs in Internet marketing.

Rasmussen was sold to Renovus Capital in 2018.

Rasmussen College became Rasmussen University in October, 2020.

Academics
The school offers more than 70 programs and is organized into seven schools: Health Sciences, Design, Business, Justice Studies, Education, Nursing, and Technology.

Accreditation
Rasmussen University is accredited by the Higher Learning Commission (HLC), the regional accreditor serving Minnesota.

Student outcomes
According to a 2012 US Senate HELP investigation on for-profit colleges led by Tom Harkin, 63.2 percent of Rasmussen students withdrew, many after only five months of study.

The College Scorecard, reports that Rasmussen University has graduation rates ranging from 21 to 31 percent, typical salary after attending of $32,600 and a student loan repayment rate of 35 percent.

References

External links
 

For-profit universities and colleges in the United States
Educational institutions established in 1900
1900 establishments in Minnesota